Mohammad Kanu Helmiawan (born 27 April 2001) is an Indonesian professional footballer who plays as a defensive midfielder for Liga 1 club Persis Solo and the Indonesia national under-23 team.

Club career

Muba Babel United
Helmiawan joined the Muba Babel United club in the 2019. He scored 1 goal and one assist in the 2019 season when Muba Babel United played in the second division.

Persita Tangerang
He was signed for Persita Tangerang to play in 2021 Menpora Cup. Helmiawan made his debut for Persita Tangerang in the 2021 Menpora Cup, he played of his team's two matches in the tournament that preluded the 2021 Liga 1 season.

Persis Solo
In 2021, Kanu Helmiawan signed a contract with Indonesian Liga 2 club Persis Solo. He made first 2021–22 Liga 2 debut on 26 September 2021, coming on as a starter in a 2–0 win against PSG Pati at the Manahan Stadium, Surakarta.

PSS Sleman (loan)
In 2022, Helmiawan signed a contract with Indonesian Liga 1 club PSS Sleman, on loan from Persis Solo. He made his league debut on 18 January 2022 in a match against Madura United at the Kapten I Wayan Dipta Stadium, Gianyar.

International career
Kanu Helmiawan has played for Indonesia at the under-19 level. He won his first cap for the under-19 team on 11 October 2020 in a friendly against North Macedonia U19. In October 2021, Kanu was called up to the Indonesia U23 in a friendly match against Tajikistan and Nepal and also prepared for 2022 AFC U-23 Asian Cup qualification in Tajikistan by Shin Tae-yong.

Career statistics

Club

Notes

Honours

Club
Persis Solo
 Liga 2: 2021

References

External links 
 Kanu Helmiawan at Soccerway
 Kanu Helmiawan at Liga Indonesia

2001 births
Living people
Sportspeople from Jakarta
Indonesian footballers
Liga 2 (Indonesia) players
Liga 1 (Indonesia) players
Muba Babel United F.C. players
Persita Tangerang players
Persis Solo players
PSS Sleman players
Indonesia youth international footballers
Association football midfielders